Young Jacob Boozer III (born November 23, 1948) is an American politician who served as the 39th State Treasurer of Alabama from 2011 to 2019 and is serving as the 41st Treasurer having been re-elected to a third term on November 8, 2022.  He was elected to his first four-year term in 2010 and was unopposed and reelected to a second term in 2014. In his role as Treasurer, Boozer also serves on a multitude of State boards and authorities bringing investment, finance and business expertise to those entities to maximize the State of Alabama’s financial resources.  

Boozer is a member of the National Association of State Treasurers (NAST) currently serving as Chair of the Banking and Cash Management Committee.   He also serves on the Governance Committee of NAST affiliate, CSPN (College Savings Plans Network).  In 2019 Boozer received the Lucille Maurer Award given to a former treasurer for outstanding service to NAST.

Early Life 
Boozer was born in Birmingham and raised in Tuscaloosa. He became an Eagle Scout in 1962. He earned a bachelor's degree in economics in 1971 from Stanford University and a master's degree in finance from the Wharton School at the University of Pennsylvania in 1973.

Boozer was named after his father, who first made the name Young Boozer famous as a football star for the University of Alabama. Young Jacob Boozer, Jr. is a member of the Alabama Sports Hall of Fame and the Alabama Business Hall of Fame. His father was named after his father, the mayor of Samson, Alabama from 1916 to 1919.[]citation

Career 
Prior to serving in public office, Boozer spent 35 years in banking, finance and investments which took him from Citibank in New York and Crocker National Bank in Los Angeles, to Coral Petroleum in Houston and Colonial Bank in Montgomery. From 2003 to 2017, Boozer was an owner in the Montgomery Biscuits minor league baseball affiliate of the Tampa Bay Rays.

After retiring from banking in 2007, Boozer began his public service career as Deputy State Finance Director for Alabama Governor Bob Riley. During his tenure in the Alabama Department of Finance, he played a key role in saving millions of taxpayer dollars through the restructuring of state bond debt and derivatives[citation]. Boozer left the Riley administration in early 2010 to run for State Treasurer in his first race for elected office. 

He has been a member of and has held leadership roles in several organizations, including the Church of the Ascension in Montgomery, where he served as a member of the vestry; the Montgomery Rotary Club, of which he is a past president; the Alabama Shakespeare Festival, where he served as chair of the board of directors; and the Montgomery Academy, where he served as past board president.[citation ] He is a member of the Montgomery Committee of 100 and a member of the Class of XXIV of Leadership Alabama.[citation] Boozer has served in many capacities at his alma mater, Stanford University; he has been on the board of trustees, chairman of the alumni association, and a recipient of the Stanford Medal which honors volunteer leaders with decades of distinguished volunteer service to the university. In 2002, Boozer was recognized with the Distinguished Eagle Scout Award by the Boy Scouts of America.

Treasurer of Alabama 

Boozer’s first two terms saw many accomplishments including leading the effort to restructure and save Alabama’s Prepaid Affordable College Tuition Program (PACT) and working with the Alabama legislature to pass Amendment 856 that restructured distributions of the Alabama Trust Fund (Alabama’s sovereign wealth fund of natural gas royalties) to provide a stable source of revenue to its recipients and provide for long-term, prudent management of its assets for higher total returns.

In his first term treasury staff was streamlined, while not only meeting, but exceeding, established performance levels.[citation] A needs-based college scholarship program was established to help first time college enrollees in Alabama which has awarded $9.3 million to more than 2,700 Alabama students.  In February 2017, the office launched the State’s ABLE (Achieving a Better Life Experience) savings plan for individuals with disabilities.

Several additional improvements were made to improve treasury operations such as expanding the types of investments in which the state treasurer could invest state funds (prior to this legislation, Alabama had the nation's most restrictive investment guidelines) and moving the treasury's budget out of the general fund freeing up $2 million of the state's general fund budget. 

After completing his second consecutive term as Treasurer in 2019 Boozer served as Assistant Superintendent of the Alabama State Banking Department and as a member of Governor Ivey's Study Group on Gambling Policy.  On October 1, 2021, Governor Kay Ivey appointed Boozer as State Treasurer to complete the remaining term of John McMillan who resigned to serve as the executive director of the Alabama Medical Cannabis Commission.

Electoral history

References

|-

1948 births
21st-century American politicians
Alabama Republicans
Living people
State treasurers of Alabama
Politicians from Birmingham, Alabama
Politicians from Tuscaloosa, Alabama
Stanford University alumni
Wharton School of the University of Pennsylvania alumni